Conquest is a 1998 British-Canadian romantic comedy film set in the dying prairie town of Conquest, Saskatchewan, most of whose remaining residents are in their 70s and depressed. Thirty-two-year-old Pincer Bedier (Lothaire Bluteau), the French-Canadian manager of the only bank branch in the town, dreams of reviving the town and its only cash crop, the edible pea pods of the Caragana bush. Daisy MacDonald (Tara Fitzgerald), a young, beautiful and mysterious English or Australian woman, happens into town in her bright red Alfa Romeo sports car and when it stalls, finds herself stranded indefinitely until the needed parts can be shipped in. Her presence invigorates the town and its inhabitants and romance develops between her and the young banker, while the older inhabitants catch his vision of the future.

Conquest was shown at the 1998 Montreal World Film Festival. In 1999 Monique Mercure won the Genie Award for Best Performance by an Actress in a Supporting Role, that of Grace Gallagher. Conquest has been shown on the Showtime network in the United States.

Cast
 Lothaire Bluteau as Pincer Bedier
 Tara Fitzgerald as Daisy MacDonald
 Monique Mercure as Grace Gallagher
 David Fox as Carl Gallagher
 Eugene Lipinski as Glenn Boychuk
 Daniel MacDonald as Erwin Boychuk 
 Quyen Hua as My Lang
 John Bourgeois as Morley
 Susan Williamson as Margaret
 Chrisse Bornstein as Dorothy
 Jean Freeman as Betty

References

External links

1998 films
Canadian comedy films
English-language Canadian films
Films set in Saskatchewan
Films shot in Saskatchewan
Films directed by Piers Haggard
1990s English-language films
1990s Canadian films